The Real Housewives of Atlanta (abbreviated RHOA) is an American reality television series that premiered on Bravo on October 7, 2008. Developed as the third installment of The Real Housewives franchise, it has aired fourteen seasons and focuses on the personal and professional lives of several women residing in and around Atlanta, Georgia.

The cast of the recent fourteenth season consists of Shereé Whitfield, Kandi Burruss, Kenya Moore, Drew Sidora, Marlo Hampton and Sanya Richards-Ross, with Monyetta Shaw-Carter serving as a friend of the housewives. Previously-featured cast members include original housewives NeNe Leakes, DeShawn Snow, Lisa Wu and Kim Zolciak-Biermann; and subsequent housewives Cynthia Bailey, Phaedra Parks, Porsha Williams, Claudia Jordan, Kim Fields, Shamari DeVoe and Eva Marcille.

The Real Housewives of Atlanta has received moderately favorable reviews from critics and has been recognized as a "guilty pleasure" by several media outlets. However, the series has been criticized for appearing to fabricate portions of its storyline. It has anchored Bravo's Sunday night offerings since the show's third season in 2010, eventually becoming Bravo's highest-rated program by 2014.

The success of the show has resulted in ten spin-offs: Don't Be Tardy, The Kandi Factory, I Dream of NeNe: The Wedding, Kandi's Wedding, Kandi's Ski Trip, Xscape: Still Kickin' It, Kandi Koated Nights, Porsha's Having a Baby, Porsha's Family Matters and Kandi & The Gang.

Overview

Seasons 1–4
The Real Housewives of Atlanta was announced as the third installment in The Real Housewives franchise, intending to capitalize on the successes of its predecessors The Real Housewives of Orange County and New York City. Throughout its run, the show has been led by five to seven housewives, who are credited by their first name. The first season premiered on October 7, 2008, starred Lisa Wu, DeShawn Snow, NeNe Leakes, Kim Zolciak and Shereé Whitfield. 

Kandi Burruss joined the show in the second season, which premiered on July 30, 2009. Snow did not return. 

Premiering on October 4, 2010, the third season saw Wu depart as a Housewife, appearing as a guest, as well as the addition of Cynthia Bailey and Phaedra Parks. 

The fourth season which premiered on November 6, 2011, saw no changes to the main cast, besides introducing Marlo Hampton as the first official "friend of the housewives".

Seasons 5–7
Whitfield did not return, while Kenya Moore and Porsha Williams joined the show in the fifth season which premiered on November 4, 2012. Zolciak quit the show halfway through filming.

The sixth season premiered on November 3, 2013, and featured the same cast from the previous season, excluding Zolciak, making Leakes the last original housewife on Atlanta at the time. Hampton returned as a guest.

The seventh season which premiered on November 9, 2014, saw Williams demoted as a friend of the housewives, alongside Demetria McKinney while Claudia Jordan was introduced as a main housewife.

Seasons 8–11
The eighth season premiered on November 8, 2015, which featured Williams returning as a full-time housewife and Kim Fields joining as the latest housewife. Whitfield returned as a friend of the housewives alongside  Shamea Morton. Leakes and Jordan did not return as Housewives., instead featuring as guests alongside Hampton and McKinney.

The ninth season premiered on November 6, 2016, with Whitfield returning in a full-time capacity. Fields did not return. Hampton made numerous guest appearances along with Morton, while original housewives Wu and Zolciak-Biermann appeared in the season finale. 

Leakes returned as a full-time cast member for the tenth season, which premiered on November 5, 2017. Parks did not return, while Zolciak-Biermann and Hampton returned as a friend of the housewives, alongside Eva Marcille. Morton and Wu appeared throughout the season as well. Whitfield, for the second time, and Moore left the show after the tenth season.

Marcille was promoted to a full-time capacity, alongside the addition of Shamari DeVoe for the eleventh season, which premiered on November 4, 2018. The season also introduced Tanya Sam as a new friend of the housewives, alongside Hampton. Moore appeared as a guest alongside Morton.

Season 12–present
The twelfth season premiered on November 3, 2019, with Moore returning full-time, and Hampton and Sam returning in recurring capacities. DeVoe did not return. Morton appeared as a guest. Marcille and Leakes announced their departure from the show in June 2020 and September 2020 respectively.

The thirteenth season premiered on December 6, 2020, with Drew Sidora joining as the newest Housewife. LaToya Ali joined as "friend of the housewives" alongside Hampton and Sam. Marcille returned as a guest alongside Morton as well as former housewives, Whitfield and Jordan.  Bailey and Williams departed the series in September 2021.

The fourteenth season premiered on May 1, 2022. Burruss, Moore, and Sidora returned, along with Hampton being promoted to a full-time cast member, after seasons in recurring and guest capacities. Whitfield also returned as a full-time cast member for a third time, along with the additions of Sanya Richards-Ross as a Housewife, and Monyetta Shaw-Carter being introduced as a "friend of the housewives". Original housewives, Snow and Wu returned as guests.

Cast

Timeline of cast members

Episodes

Storylines
In its series premiere, The Real Housewives of Atlanta introduced Wu-Hartwell, Snow, Leakes, Zolciak, and Whitfield. Leakes and Whitfield were in the midst of a personal conflict, which escalated after Leakes was excluded from Whitfield's birthday party. Meanwhile, Zolciak was revealed to be dating a publicly unknown boyfriend nicknamed "Big Papa", and later decided to pursue her aspirations of becoming a country music singer. Her friendship with Leakes deteriorated after she established a companionship with Whitfield, and was ended after Leakes made sarcastic remarks about Zolciak's music career. Snow and Wu-Hartwell additionally looked to establish prominence as a socialite and a jewelry designer, respectively. Whitfield attempted to launch her own fashion line and organize a lunch for the women to reconcile, although both ventures proved unsuccessful in the finale of the first season.

The second season saw the exit of Snow and the introduction of Burruss, who had recently become engaged to her boyfriend A.J. and expressed interest in reviving her music career. An attempted reconciliation between Leakes, Whitfield, and Zolciak failed to come to fruition, with Whitfield notably tugging on Zolciak's wig to "shift it a little bit". Meanwhile, a feud developed between Leakes and Burruss after the latter became friends with Zolciak and helped her record her single "Tardy for the Party". Meanwhile, Zolciak attempted to launch her own wig line and became engaged to Big Papa, while Wu-Hartwell and Whitfield launched their own clothing collections.

The third season saw the exit of Wu as a Housewife, and the introduction of Bailey and Parks, while Leakes and Zolciak reconciled as the former contemplated divorcing her husband Gregg and the latter began a lesbian relationship. Parks, who was in the middle of her pregnancy, clashed with her husband Apollo Nida over their differing opinions on parenting; she gave birth later in the season. Meanwhile, Zolciak and Burruss continued recording music together, although they clashed over their creative differences. Bailey later became engaged to her boyfriend Peter Thomas, while Zolciak set her affections on football player Kroy Biermann; a conflict between Burruss, Leakes, and Zolciak later ensued while the latter two women embark on a promotional concert tour. Against the advice of her mother and sister, Bailey married Thomas in the third-season finale.

The fourth season begins with Hampton being introduced as a 'friend of the housewives', as Zolciak was in the middle of her first pregnancy by her boyfriend Biermann; she later gave birth to their son. Leakes continued divorce proceedings with Gregg, while Whitfield found herself in financial difficulties after her ex-husband failed to pay child support. Meanwhile, Bailey opened her own modeling agency, while Parks looked to launch a family-operated funeral home. Leakes's new friendship with Hampton caused tension between all of the women, which escalated during a group vacation in South Africa; while Zolciak, who had remained home with her children, became upset by negative comments Bailey (not Burruss) made about her during the group vacation. As the season closed, Leakes began to reconsider her divorce from Gregg.

The fifth season saw Whitfield exit as a Housewife for the first time, and introduced former Miss USA Moore and football player Kordell Stewart's wife Williams, Leakes reconciled with Gregg and pondered the possibility of remarrying him. Zolciak was forced to move out of her mansion, which she and Biermann had attempted to purchase less than a year earlier, Leakes began to question Moore's seemingly unfaithful behavior towards her boyfriend Walter during a group trip to Anguilla, which began a feud between Leakes and Williams against Moore. Moore wished to marry Walter although their relationship had begun to deteriorate, while Parks and Moore created competing workout DVDs after plans to make the project a joint venture proved unsuccessful. Toward the end of the season, Williams attempted to revive her failing marriage to Stewart with therapist sessions.

The sixth season saw the first exit of Zolciak. Williams realised her marriage to Stewart was not salvageable as the season commenced, while Leakes became upset with Moore after the latter went against "girl code" by inappropriately communicating with Nida. Moore moved out of her rental property after being evicted, while Leakes returned to Atlanta full-time after her television series The New Normal was canceled. Burruss struggled to manage the conflict between her estranged mother Joyce and her longtime boyfriend Todd Tucker, although they attempted to reconcile as the couple became engaged and began planning their nuptials. In a later attempt to salvage the relationships between the women, Leakes hosted a couples pajama party for their group, although the women continued to clash with one another; a later spa gathering failed to resolve residual tension between Leakes and Moore. Meanwhile, Williams attempted to launch her career as an actress after being cast in Burruss's musical. Notably, after a verbal war at the reunion war, Williams pulls Moore's hair and drags her across the floor. She was charged with assault.

The seventh season sees Williams demoted to a 'friend of' role, replaced by Jordan, introduced as a friend of Moore's, where the latter helps Jordan adjust to Atlanta life. Jordan and Williams struggle to bond despite working for the same radio company. Parks' husband Nida is charged with bank fraud and identity theft, and in turn, was sentenced to 8 years of prison time. After Nida's behavior became increasingly erratic prior to his conviction, Parks sought refuge in other accommodation. Nida, in retaliation, alleges in conversation with Bailey's husband Thomas that Parks has been having an affair. Bailey brings this rumor to light at a group dinner, orchestrating chaos between Moore and Parks. Parks grows upset about Burruss' lack of defence of her, finding solace with Williams and Leakes. Leakes makes her Broadway debut as Madame in Rodgers & Hammerstein's Cinderella, and has come to blows with most members of the group. Leakes bows out of a group trip to Manila, where Parks and Moore reconcile after a years-long feud.

The eighth season sees Williams return to her original capacity as a Housewife, alongside new addition Fields. Leakes is demoted to an extended guest capacity, Jordan does not return, and Whitfield returns as a 'friend'. A video of Bailey's husband Thomas allegedly being unfaithful circulates, leading to a confrontation by Moore to Thomas at Bailey's eyewear line launch party. Moore also clashes with street neighbour Whitfield regarding the construction of both homes. Moore reaches out to Fields' production company regarding her television show pilot. However, Moore begins to increasingly grow more irritated of Fields' condescending behaviour towards her and it falls through. Williams' anger comes into question throughout the season, such as her involvement in a physical altercation with Bailey on a group yacht trip. The group fly to Miami bringing along friend of Cynthia, Tammy McCall-Browning. McCall-Browning's nephew fights with Moore as she feels threatened by him and knocks unconscious aunt McCall-Browning. Bailey chooses Fields' company over Moore's to produce a commercial for her eyewear line in Jamaica. The group head to Jamaica, joined by NeNe and Gregg Leakes, to holiday and shoot the commercial. Parks, a newly single mother following her husbands' arrest, and Burruss' friendship begins to decline.

The ninth season sees Fields and Leakes depart the show, the ladder for the first time. Whitfield returns as a full-time housewife, while Zolciak-Biermann and Hampton return in a guest capacity. Parks spends the season coping with her divorce from Nida. She has ended her friendship with Burruss, and forms a close friendship with Williams (who together are deemed "Frick and Frack"). Williams claims she has a source that says Burruss and Tucker conspired to rape her using drugs; this accusation leads to a feud between them, as well as tensions within the group due to its severity. Bailey's marriage to Thomas unravels, and she too begins divorce proceedings with some guilt. Moore beings dating Matt Jordan, but the relationship turns abusive and she has difficulty in breaking up with him. She and Whitfield also complete construction on their homes, continuing to clash over their decorations. Moore upsets Whitfield by going with Burruss into her home's unfinished basement, which begins a feud with Zolciak-Biermann after the ladder makes disparaging remarks about Moore. Whitfield coins herself as "the bone collector". In the final reunion episodes, Williams reveals that she learned about the claim from Parks, who had seemingly created the claim vindictively against Burruss.

The tenth season sees the firing of Parks over fabricating the rape accusation and other aspects of her storyline. Leaks returns as a full-time housewife, while Zolciak-Biermann returns as a 'friend' through Whitfield. Hampton and Eva Marcille join as 'friends' through their connections to Leakes. Williams attempts to reconcile with the women over her role in Parks' smear campaign against Burruss throughout the season. While on the group vacation in Barcelona, a fight between her and Hampton results in her going back home early. Leakes nurses her husband through health issues while revitalizing her acting career by doing stand-up. Burruss launches a restaurant with her relatives, and prepares to launch a reunion tour for her former girl group Xscape. Burruss invites Leakes to open for the group on the tour, but is forced to drop her after a confrontation between Leakes and a heckler creates controversy. Bailey begins to date following her divorce from Thomas, but finds conflict with Marcille when she accuses her new beau of cheating on his girlfriend with Bailey. Moore returns married to New York entrepreneur Mark Daly, the legality of which is met with skepticism from Zolciak-Biermann and Hampton. She finds her marriage under pressure due to their long-distance relationship and his reluctance to be in the public eye. Whitfield alienates the other women due to her friendship with Zolciak-Biermann, whose feuds with Leakes and Moore draw accusations of racism.

Reception

Critical response
The Real Housewives of Atlanta has been moderately well received by critics. Writing for Common Sense Media, Melissa Camacho spoke favorably of the series' emphasis on "a successful and powerful segment of the African-American community" that appears to be frequently neglected by the popular television. Tim Hall from the Seattle Post-Intelligencer commented of his general distaste for reality television, particularly describing The Real Housewives of Orange County as "utterly ridiculous". However, he admitted that the dynamic and conflict between the women, in addition to the wealthy lifestyles they led, to be "somewhat entertaining". In a more mixed review, Alessandra Stanley from The New York Times joked that its portrayal of wealth served as "the best choice for a time capsule of the Bling Decade" when noting the economic downturn the United States experienced around the time that the series premiered, although more seriously stated that the housewives' luxuries "was never all that enviable, and now it looks as if it might not be viable." Hanh Nguyen from Zap2It shared a similar sentiment, criticizing that the "showy elite and rampant consumerism" that the women regularly display "seems rather out of touch" given the United States' economic hardship, although she elaborated that the program "[is] not by any means boring, but you do have to be in the mood to watch."

The Real Housewives of Atlanta has been recognized as a "guilty pleasure" by several media outlets. Writing for About.com, Latoya West commented that the "self-absorbed" nature of the housewives may become irritating to viewers, but noted that the series' "divalicious drama might be addictive." In 2009, a writer from Essence mentioned that they "couldn't get enough of the ladies" from the program, and recognized it as the best reality show of the year. Writing for Today, Leslie Bruce commented that The Real Housewives franchise in general rose to prominence for its depiction of "foul-mouthed, often catfighting and always self-promoting" women, and stated that they "dominate water-cooler discussions [...] by showcasing at times the worst of female behavior."

In December 2013, Williams received additional criticism for comments made in an episode aired during the sixth season, where she indicated that she believed the Underground Railroad was an actual railroad line.

American television ratings
The Real Housewives of Atlanta is the most popular of the Real Housewives franchise. In 2016, a study from The New York Times of the 50 television shows with the most Facebook Likes found that it was "most popular in the Black Belt, but maintains fairly consistent popularity everywhere" in the US.

The first season maintained an average of 1.495 million weekly viewers; Bravo announced that the series had become the first program from the network to "crack the two million viewer mark among adults 18–49." The premiere episode of the second season was watched by 2.66 million people, setting the record for the highest-rated The Real Housewives premiere episode in the franchise's history at the time. The third season averaged a weekly viewership of 3.6 million people, while the fourth and fifth seasons premiered with 2.8 million and 3.2 million viewers, respectively. The sixth-season premiere was watched by 3.1 million people; with 1.9 million viewers being classified in the adults 25–54 demographic, it became the highest-rated episode in this target demographic. As of February 2014, The Real Housewives of Atlanta is the highest-rated installment of The Real Housewives franchise, and is additionally the most-watched series airing on Bravo. The premiere episode of the seventh season attracted over 3.8 million viewers during its initial broadcast on November 9, 2014, including 2.2 million viewers in the 18–49 demographic via Nielsen ratings. It marked as the most watched season premiere ever to air on Bravo. However, viewership has dropped to an all-time low, averaging 1.2 million viewers weekly throughout its 13th season.

Broadcast history
The Real Housewives of Atlanta airs regularly on Bravo in the United States; most episodes are approximately one hour in length, and are broadcast in standard definition and high definition. Since its premiere, the series has alternated airing on Monday, Tuesday, Thursday, and Sunday evenings and has been frequently shifted between the 8:00, 9:00, and 10:00 PM timeslots.

References

External links
 
 
 

 
2008 American television series debuts
2000s American reality television series
2010s American reality television series
2020s American reality television series
African-American reality television series
Bravo (American TV network) original programming
English-language television shows
Television shows set in Atlanta
Television shows filmed in Atlanta
Television series by Endemol